This is a list of notable alumni of the University of Brighton.

Acting
 Chris Barrie, actor and impressionist
 Paddy Considine, actor
 Pooja Shah, actress and model

Artists and authors

Music
 Norman Cook, DJ, musician and producer
 Natasha Khan, musician, Bat for Lashes
 Orlando Weeks, musician, The Maccabees
 Joseph Mount, musician and founding member of Metronomy

Photography
Stuart Griffiths, photographer
Mark Power, Magnum photographer
John Rankin Waddell (Rankin), portrait and fashion photographer

Sport
 Kate Allenby MBE, modern pentathlon, bronze medallist at the 2000 Summer Olympics
 Gillian Clarke MBE, Olympic hockey umpire at three Olympic games
 Ben Hawes, Great Britain field hockey team at the 2008 Summer Olympics
 David Luckes, Great Britain hockey player who participated in three Summer Olympics (1992, 1996 and 2000) and Head of Sport Competition for the 2012 Summer Olympics
 David Stone, Paralympic bicyclist, won two gold medals at the 2008 Summer Olympics
 Tanya Streeter, world champion free diver

Other

References

External links
 University of Brighton alumni association 

University of Brighton
Brighton